Savages is the ninth studio album by American heavy metal band Soulfly, released on September 30, 2013. The album is the first to feature drummer Zyon Cavalera, frontman Max's son, in a full-time capacity after the departure of David Kinkade in 2012. The first single from the album, "Bloodshed" featuring Max's other son (and Zyon's brother) Igor, debuted on the BBC Radio 1 Rock Show on August 6, 2013.

The album was produced by Terry Date, who had previously performed mixing work for Soulfly on 3, Prophecy and Dark Ages. The album features a number of guest vocalists including Lody Kong's Igor Cavalera Jr., I Declare War's Jamie Hanks, Clutch's Neil Fallon and Napalm Death's Mitch Harris.

Savages marks the group's first record to be released on Nuclear Blast Records. It was released in CD (digipak edition with two bonus tracks, and standard jewel case), limited edition vinyl, and digital download formats.

The album debuted at No. 84 on the Billboard 200, selling 4,700 copies during the first week after the release.

Songs
"Bloodshed" is the first of three singles released from the album. This song plays in mid-tempo and contains little tribal influences. "El Comegente" features Portuguese and Spanish lyrics about the 1980s Venezuelan serial killer and cannibal Dorángel Vargas, who is an "El Comegente", Spanish for people eater. Tony Campos is featured as vocalist while playing bass. The closing section has Led Zeppelin-like acoustic bass solo and Marc Rizzo calls this part "Mars Part Two".

"Master of Savagery" is the quasi-title track and the second single of the album containing grooves similar to earlier Soulfly albums followed by bass solo. The album's third single, "Ayatollah of Rock 'n' Rolla", has Pantera-like grooves with clean vocals by Neil Fallon. "Fallen" begins with an acoustic guitar, then thrashy riffs, followed by monster-like growls by guest Jamie Hanks of I Declare War. "Cannibal Holocaust" is a speedy song speaking about destruction of humanity due to cannibalism.

Track listing

Reception
Savages is generally positively reviewed by critics. Matt Hinch of about.com said that "For the most part, Savages is fairly typical Soulfly. It's a mix of the new and old without flip-flopping song to song, yet still way more aggressive and thrashy than their first three albums." James Christopher Conger of AllMusic described that this album continues the Soulfly tradition, "meant to be taken as both a warning and a rebel yell, offering up an audio invoice for our past transgressions and a shot of adrenaline for the war ahead." Record Collector praised this album as very good, "Savages is a feisty record that returns to the familiar blend of hardcore, thrash and groove metal." One review had a negative response. According to Kerrang! this album has "too many songs utilise the same plodding, mid-paced grooves and simple, one-line refrains."

According to Blabbermouth.net, Max Cavalera stated that this album is "about the human condition right now. We have the Internet and we're working on missions to Mars, but we are still decapitating each other and blowing up marathons. We're still savages. Even with technology and how far we've come in the world, our spirit is still that of a savage". This publisher reviewed that this album's riffing connects well with Soulfly. Another critic (musicOMH) had a mixed response, but this album signals an end of bad situations.

Personnel

Soulfly
Max Cavalera – vocals, four-string guitar, sitar
Marc Rizzo – lead guitar, flamenco guitar, sitar
Tony Campos – bass, acoustic bass guitar, vocals on "El Comegente"
Zyon Cavalera – drums, percussion
Additional musician
Neil Fallon – additional vocals on "Ayatollah of Rock 'n' Rolla"
Mitch Harris – additional vocals on "K.C.S."
Jamie Hanks – additional vocals on "Fallen"
Igor Cavalera Jr. – additional vocals on "Bloodshed"

Production
Terry Date – production, engineering, mixing
Sam Hofstedt – additional engineering
Ted Jensen – mastering
Monte Conner – A&R
Management
Gloria Cavalera – management
Christina Stajanovic – assistant
Bryan Roberts – assistant
Artwork
Paul Stottler – album cover art, design
Ted Venemann – layout, design, photography
Leo Zulueta – Soulfly logo

Charts

References

Soulfly albums
2013 albums
Albums produced by Terry Date
Nuclear Blast albums